Duncan Alister Hales (born 22 November 1947) is a former New Zealand rugby union player. A three-quarter, Hales represented Canterbury, Manawatu and, briefly, Hawke's Bay at a provincial level, and was a member of the New Zealand national side, the All Blacks, from 1972 to 1973. He played 27 matches for the All Blacks including four internationals.

References

1947 births
Living people
Canterbury rugby union players
Hawke's Bay rugby union players
Lincoln University (New Zealand) alumni
Manawatu rugby union players
New Zealand chiropractors
New Zealand international rugby union players
New Zealand rugby union players
Palmer College of Chiropractic alumni
People educated at Dannevirke High School
Rugby union centres
Rugby union players from Dannevirke
Rugby union wings